The Europe Sails Independent is an Austrian high-wing, single-place, hang glider, designed and produced by Europe Sails.

Design and development
The Independent was introduced in 2003 as a "topless" competition design, lacking a kingpost and top rigging. It is available in two sizes.

The aircraft is made from a combination of 7075 aluminum tubing and carbon-fiber-reinforced polymer, with the wing covered in 170g Dacron sailcloth. The wing nose angle is 132°. The wing features carbon fibre tips to smooth airflow and improve handling. The model number indicates the approximate wing area in square meters.

Variants
Independent 13
This model sold for €5084 in 2003.
Independent 14
This model sold for €5168 in 2003.

Specifications (Independent 14)

References

Hang gliders